Coşkun Ömer, more commonly known as Cosh Omar, (born in London, England) is a British actor and playwright of Turkish Cypriot descent. Omar’s most notable plays include The Battle of Green Lanes and The Great Extension which deal with multicultural issues in London with the use of comedy. He has also appeared in several TV episodes including: The Bill, Bleak House, EastEnders and Spooks.

References

External links
 

Living people
Year of birth missing (living people)
Male actors from London
English male television actors
English writers
English people of Turkish Cypriot descent
English male stage actors
Writers from London